Nyolge or Nyagulgule (Njalgulgule) is an Eastern Sudanic language of the Daju family, spoken in a single village in South Sudan.

References

Daju languages